64th ACE Eddie Awards
February 7, 2014

Feature Film (Dramatic): 
Captain Phillips

Feature Film (Comedy or Musical): 
American Hustle

The 64th American Cinema Editors Eddie Awards, which were presented on February 7, 2014 at the Beverly Hilton Hotel, honored the best editors in films and television.

Winners and nominees

Film 
Best Edited Feature Film – Dramatic:

Christopher Rouse – Captain Phillips
 Joe Walker – 12 Years a Slave
 Alfonso Cuarón and Mark Sanger – Gravity
 Eric Zumbrunnen and Jeff Buchanan – Her
 Mark Livolsi – Saving Mr. Banks
Best Edited Feature Film – Comedy or Musical:

Jay Cassidy, Crispin Struthers, and Alan Baumgarten – American Hustle
 Stephen Mirrione – August: Osage County
 Ethan Coen, Joel Coen – Inside Llewyn Davis
 Kevin Kent – Nebraska
 Thelma Schoonmaker – The Wolf of Wall Street
Best Edited Animated Feature Film:

Jeff Draheim – Frozen
 Gregory Perler – Despicable Me 2
 Greg Snyder – Monsters University
Best Edited Documentary Feature:

Douglas Blush, Kevin Klauber and Jason Zeldes – 20 Feet from Stardom
 Eli Despres – Blackfish
 Patrick Sheffield – Tim's Vermeer

Television 
Best Edited Half-Hour Series for Television:

David Rogers and Claire Scanlon – The Office: "Finale"
 Meg Reticker and Ken Eluto – 30 Rock: "Hogcock! / Last Lunch"
 Kabir Akhtar and A.J. Dickerson – Arrested Development: "Flight of the Phoenix"
Best Edited One Hour Series for Commercial Television:

Skip MacDonald – Breaking Bad: "Felina"
 Skip MacDonald and Sharidan Williams-Sotelo – Breaking Bad: "Buried"
 Kelley Dixon and Chris McCaleb – Breaking Bad: "Granite State"
 Skip MacDonald – Breaking Bad: "Ozymandias"
 Scott Vickrey – The Good Wife: "Hitting the Fan"
Best Edited One Hour Series for Non-Commercial Television:

Terry Kelley – Homeland: "Big Man in Tehran"
 Oral Norrie Ottey – Game of Thrones: "The Rains of Castamere"
 Kirk Baxter – House of Cards: "Chapter 1"
Best Edited Mini-Series or Motion Picture for Television:

Mary Ann Bernard – Behind the Candelabra
 Stewart Schill – American Horror Story: Asylum: "The Name Game"
 Barbara Tulliver – Phil Spector
Best Edited Non-scripted series

Nick Brigden – Anthony Bourdain: Parts Unknown: Tokyo
 Rob Goubeaux, Mark S. Andrew, Paul J. Coyne, Jennifer Nelson, Martin Skibosh and Trevor Campbell – Beyond Scared Straight: "The Return of Hustle Man"
 Josh Earl, Alex Durham and Rob Butler – Deadliest Catch: "Mutiny on the Bering Sea"

Golden Eddie Filmmaker of the Year Award 
Paul Greengrass

Career Achievement Award 
 Richard Halsey
 Robert C. Jones

Heritage Award 
Randy Roberts

Student Editing Award 
Ambar Salinas – Video Symphony
 Kevin Cheung – Video Symphony
Eric Kench - Video Symphony
 Noah Cody – American Film Institute

References

External links
ACE Award 2014 at the Internet Movie Database

64
2014 film awards
2014 guild awards
2014 in American cinema